is a passenger railway station located in the city of Fuchū, Tokyo, Japan, operated by East Japan Railway Company (JR East).

Lines
Nishifu Station is served by the Nambu Line, and is situated 30.0 km from the terminus of the line at Kawasaki Station

Station layout
The station consists of two ground-level opposed side platforms, with an elevated station building above the tracks and platforms. The station is staffed.

Platforms

History
The station opened on 14 March 2009.

Passenger statistics
In fiscal 2019, the station was used by an average of 10,664 passengers daily (boarding passengers only). The passenger figures (boarding passengers only) for previous years are as shown below.

Surrounding area

Chuo Expressway National Fuchu Interchange
NEC (NEC) Fuchu Plant

See also
 List of railway stations in Japan

References

External links

 JR East: Nishifu Station information 

Stations of East Japan Railway Company
Railway stations in Tokyo
Railway stations in Japan opened in 2009
Nambu Line
Fuchū, Tokyo